Home entertainment system may refer to:

 Home cinema, or home theatre, a home entertainment system that reproduces a movie theater experience and mood, using video and audio equipment
 Home theatre PC, or media center appliance, a device that combines capabilities of a personal computer with a software application supporting video, photo, music playback, and sometimes video recording functionality